Pan African School of Theology (PAST) is an evangelical theological college located in Nyahururu, Kenya. PAST is a globally significant entity as the first academic institution in the world solely dedicated to engaging men and women of African descent in scholarly dialogue over Pan-African issues in theology and ethnic teleology from a Biblical perspective.

History
PAST was founded in 2006 by Pan African Christian Exchange (PACE Ministries International), an indigenous Christian mission organisation located in Nyahururu, Kenya. The college was given a mandate to provide higher education to local pastors and facilitate scholarly dialogue among people of African descent in the fields of theology and teleology. Today, PAST is a private, inter-denominational, residential and day college located on the equator at the eastern rim of the Great Rift Valley in the Aberdare Range highlands of central Kenya.

Programmes
In association with the South African Theological Seminary (SATS), PAST facilitates accredited programmes in:
Certificate in Christian Life
Diploma in Biblical Studies
Bachelor of Theology

Their programs are designed to prepare students for serving in areas of: 
 Leadership & Management
 Relief & Development 
 Peacemaking & Reconciliation
 Cultural studies
 Music
 Evangelism
 Communications (Broadcast & Publishing)
 Counseling & Psychology

Accreditation and relationships

Pan African School of Theology is pursuing independent school accreditation by the Accrediting Council for Theological Education in Africa (ACTEA). SATS' programs are registered with the Commission for Higher Education (CHE) in South Africa, the Education and Training Quality Assurer (ETQA) of the South African Qualifications Authority (SAQA) and are registered by the Department of Education (registration number 01HX01).

At PAST, academic seasons follow a cycle of three twelve-week terms followed by four weeks of holiday. Michaelmas Term runs from September to November, Lent Term from January to March and Trinity Term completes the year from May to July graduation.

PAST maintains working relationships with other institutions throughout Kenya and Africa, such as Nairobi Evangelical Graduate School of Theology (NEGST), University of Nairobi, Daystar University, Nairobi International School of Theology (NIST), Pwani Bible Institute, St. Paul's United Theological College, Scott Christian University, Kabarak University and the Association of Evangelicals in Africa. Pan African School of Theology is to be distinguished from Pan Africa Christian University (PAC) (Nairobi, Kenya, East Africa); Pan-Africa Theological Seminary (PAThS)(Togo, West Africa) and The Pan-African Seminarians Association at Claremont School of Theology, with which there are no organizational connections.

See also 
 Pan-Africanism
 Pan-African Congress
 African diaspora
 Brown people
 Black people
 Race
 Black Consciousness Movement
 African theology
 teleology
 List of universities and colleges in Kenya

References

External links
www.pacekenya.org/past/ The official website of PAST 
www.pacekenya.org The official website of PACE

Education in Rift Valley Province
Seminaries and theological colleges in Kenya
Evangelical seminaries and theological colleges
Universities and colleges in Kenya
Educational institutions established in 2006
2006 establishments in Kenya

ia:Theologia nigre